The Cornirostridae is a taxonomic family of sea snails, marine gastropod mollusks in the informal group Lower Heterobranchia.

Genera
 † Anomalorbina Paul, 1996 
 † Bonnetella Cossmann, 1918 
 Cornirostra Ponder, 1990
  † Heteronatica Guzhov, 2019
 Noerrevangia Warén & Schander, 1993
 Tomura Pilsbry & McGinty, 1946
 Genus brought into synonymy
 † Anomalorbis Paul, 1991 synonym of † Anomalorbina Paul, 1996 (invalid: junior homonym of Anomalorbis Vine, 1972 (Annelida); see Anomalorbina)
 † Bonnetia Cossmann, 1907: synonym of † Bonnetella Cossmann, 1918 (junior homonym of Bonnetia Robineau-Desvoidy, 1830 [Diptera])

References 

 Bouchet P., Rocroi J.P., Hausdorf B., Kaim A., Kano Y., Nützel A., Parkhaev P., Schrödl M. & Strong E.E. (2017). Revised classification, nomenclator and typification of gastropod and monoplacophoran families. Malacologia. 61(1-2): 1-526
 Romani & Sbrana, A new Mediterranean species of the Cornirostridae (Gastropoda, Heterobranchia), with notes on the genus Tomura; Iberus 34 (1) 55-61, 2016
 Rubio, F. & Rolàn, E.& Fernandez-Garcés, R., 2013. Heterobranch gastropods from Cuba: the family Cornirostridae (Heterobranchia, Valvatoidea). Iberus 31(1): 75-85

External links
 The Taxonomicon